Tachiadenus is a plant genus in the gentian family (Gentianaceae), tribe Exaceae. It contains 12 species. The genus is endemic to Madagascar.

Species 
The following species are recognised:

 Tachiadenus antaisaka Humbert
 Tachiadenus boivinii Humbert ex Klack.
 Tachiadenus carinatus Griseb.
 Tachiadenus gracilis Griseb.
 Tachiadenus longiflorus Griseb.
 Tachiadenus longifolius Scott Elliot
 Tachiadenus pervillei Humbert
 Tachiadenus platypterus Baker
 Tachiadenus tubiflorus Griseb.
 Tachiadenus umbellatus Klack.
 Tachiadenus vohimavensis Humbert

References

Gentianaceae
Gentianaceae genera
Endemic flora of Madagascar